The Volta a Catalunya (Tour of Catalonia) is a road bicycle race held annually in Catalonia, Spain.

It is one of three World Tour stage races in Spain, together with the Vuelta a España and the Tour of the Basque Country. The race has had several different calendar dates, running before in September, June and May. Since 2010 it has been on the calendar in late March as part of the UCI World Tour.

Raced over seven days, it covers the autonomous community of Catalonia in Northeast Spain and contains one or more stages in the mountain region of the Pyrenees. The race traditionally finishes with a stage in Barcelona, Catalonia's capital, on a circuit with the famous Montjuïc climb and park.

First held in 1911, the Volta a Catalunya is the fourth-oldest still-existing cycling stage race in the world. Only the Tour de France (1903), the Tour of Belgium (1908) and the Giro d'Italia (1909) are older. It was the second cycling event organized on the Iberian Peninsula, only after the amateur and sub-23 race Volta a Tarragona (1908), equally held in Catalonia but no longer on the calendar. Catalan cycling icon Mariano Cañardo won the race seven times in the 1920s and 1930s, setting an unsurpassed record.

In 2018, the one-day women's competition reVolta was organised on the same day of the last men's stage.

History

The pioneering days
The Volta a Catalunya was created in 1911 by cycling journalist Miquel Arteman, editor of Barcelona-based sports newspaper El Mundo Deportivo. Arteman partnered with Narcisse Masferrer, president of Spanish Cycling Union, and Jaume Grau, founder and owner of El Mundo Deportivo.

The first edition was held from 6 to 8 January 1911. 43 riders signed up but only 34 started on Barcelona's Plaça de Sarrià. The first stage was run from Barcelona to Tarragona at 97 km, the second from Tarragona to Lleida at 111 km and the final 157 km stage from Lleida back to Barcelona, totaling 363 km. 22 riders finished the race on the Velodrome di Sants. Catalan rider Seabastià Masdeu won the first and third stage and became the first overall winner. The winner's average speed was 23 km/h.

The Club Deportivo Barcelona, presided by Miquel Arteman, took on the race organization in 1912 and 1913. The event was still organized on a three-stage format and amassed large numbers of spectators along the largely unpaved roads. Local Catalan riders Josép Magdalena and Juan Martí won the second and third edition. After 1913 the Volta a Catalunya was suspended because of World War I and reprised in 1920, but was discontinued again the next two years because of the chaotic return of the race.

Revival and Spanish Civil War

The race was revived in 1923 for its fifth edition. The organization was taken over by the Unión Deportiva de Sants, which also supported Barcelonese football teams. The race grew to a one-week event and gained prestige fast. It became a fixture on the calendar, attracting more foreign participants, mainly from France and Italy. The 1920s and 1930s became the era of Catalan cycling icon Mariano Cañardo, who became the leading figure of the Volta a Catalunya with seven victories.

During the Spanish Civil War, the race had its last interruptions in 1937 and 1938, hampering Cañardo's winning streak. After the civil war, World War II broke out in the rest of Europe and, while Catalonia was war-ridden and despite lacking foreign participants, the race was at the peak of its popularity and considered a symbol of Catalan sports culture. In 1945, marking the event's 25th edition, the Volta a Catalunya was exceptionally run over two weeks, before returning to its seven-day format the next year.

Modern era
In the course of the years, some of cycling's greatest riders have won the race. Miguel Poblet won the Volta twice in the 1950s, Jacques Anquetil in 1967, Eddy Merckx in 1968, Luis Ocaña in 1971, Felice Gimondi in 1972, Francesco Moser in 1978, Sean Kelly in 1984 and 1986. Miguel Induráin, Spanish cycling icon of the modern era, won the race three times in the early 1990s. Colombian Álvaro Mejía became the first non-European winner in 1993.

From 1941 until 1994 the race was held in September. When UCI revolutionized the international cycling calendar in 1995, the Vuelta a España obtained the September date and the Volta a Catalunya moved to June on the calendar. The race finished two weeks before the start of the Tour de France and the Volta became a principal preparation race for general classification protagonists. Frenchman Laurent Jalabert won the 1995 edition, preceding his fourth place in that year's Tour de France.

In 1999, 22-year old Spanish rider Manuel Sanroma died as a result of a crash during the second stage of the race. Sanroma, a promising sprinter, was the favourite to win the stage, but fell head-first onto a sidewalk at one kilometer from the finish in Vilanova i la Geltrú. Despite wearing a helmet, he succumbed to his injuries in hospital. The next day, riders decided to neutralize the stage to Barcelona.

World Tour Race
In 2005 the Volta a Catalunya was included in the inaugural UCI Pro Tour and the date was shifted to May, to avoid the Tour de Suisse date. The edition was won by Ukrainian Yaroslav Popovych but the move did not prove successful because the new date coincided with the Giro d'Italia.

In 2010 the race moved to late March on the calendar, the slot formerly held by another Catalan stage race, the Setmana Catalana. Joaquim Rodríguez, the foremost Catalan rider of his generation, won the race twice since the date shift. Alberto Contador, winner of the 2011 edition, was later stripped of his win after his positive doping test in the 2010 Tour de France. Italian runner-up Michele Scarponi was retroactively awarded the victory. The 2020 edition was cancelled due to the COVID-19 pandemic.

Route
Since the race's earlier date on the calendar in late March, the Volta a Catalunya starts in one of the coastal resorts on the Costa Brava with a stage through rolling terrain inland, usually suited for sprinters.

The race addresses the Pyrenees mountains in the middle part of the race, although the mountains are usually less high than before the date shift, due to often snowy and cold conditions on high altitude in March. One of the regular climbs in the race is the summit finish to La Molina, an 11.6 km climb with a 4.8% average gradient. The ski resort in Alp takes the peloton deep into the Pyrenees to 1694 m altitude, with the weather often a decisive factor.

The race traditionally finishes with a hilly stage in Barcelona on a circuit, featuring eight trips over the Montjuïc climb and park.

Winners

Multiple winners

Wins per country

Most stage wins

Jerseys
The leader of the overall general classification receives a white-and-green striped jersey. There are also three other classifications. The winner of the points classification (sprints) wears a white-and-orange striped jersey, a white-and-red striped jersey for the winner of the mountain classification and the jersey of the Catalonia regional cycling team is for the best classified Catalan. There is also a team classification.

See also
 Setmana Catalana de Ciclisme
 Tour of the Basque Country
 Vuelta a España
 UCI ProTour

Notes

References

External links

  
 

 
1911 establishments in Spain
Volta
Catalonia
Recurring sporting events established in 1911
UCI ProTour races
UCI World Tour races
Super Prestige Pernod races